The American television series The Love Boat (Love Boat in its final season), set on a cruise ship, was aired on ABC from September 24, 1977, until May 24, 1986. Each episode has multiple titles, referencing the simultaneous storylines contained within. There were three pilot movies, followed by 245 regular episodes over nine seasons, followed by five specials.

There were typically three storylines in each episode. One storyline usually focused on a member of the crew, a second storyline would often focus on a crew member interacting with a passenger, and the third storyline was more focused on a single passenger (or a group of passengers). The three storylines usually followed a similar thematic pattern: One storyline (typically the "crew" one) was straight-ahead comedy. The second would typically follow more of a romantic comedy format (with only occasional dramatic elements). The third storyline would usually be the most dramatic of the three, often offering few (if any) laughs and a far more serious tone.

Series overview

Episodes

Pilot movies (1976–77)

Season 1 (1977–78)

Season 2 (1978–79)

Season 3 (1979–80)

Season 4 (1980–81)

Season 5 (1981–82)

Season 6 (1982–83)

Season 7 (1983–84)

Season 8 (1984–85)

Season 9 (1985–86)

Specials (1986–90)

Home media
The following DVD sets were released by CBS Home Entertainment:

References

External links

Love Boat